Le Gouray is a former commune in the Côtes-d'Armor department of Brittany in northwestern France. On 1 January 2016, it was merged into the new commune Le Mené.

The Arguenon river originates in the commune.

Population

See also
Communes of the Côtes-d'Armor department

References

External links

Former communes of Côtes-d'Armor